Christopher Dodge House is a house in Providence, Rhode Island that was built in 1858.  It is operated as a bed and breakfast hotel.

References

Houses in Providence, Rhode Island